The Court at 744-756½ S. Marengo Ave. is a bungalow court located at 744-756½ S. Marengo Ave. in Pasadena, California. The court includes six buildings containing fourteen residential units centered on a driveway. Two of the buildings are two stories tall, while the remainder are one story. Contractor D. J. Ringle built the court in 1931. The homes were designed in the Art Deco style and feature fluted parapets and engaged piers. The court is one of the few Art Deco residential properties in Pasadena and has thus been called "probably the most unusual" bungalow court in the city.

The court was added to the National Register of Historic Places on July 11, 1983.

References

External links

Bungalow courts
Houses in Pasadena, California
Houses completed in 1931
Houses on the National Register of Historic Places in California
National Register of Historic Places in Pasadena, California
1931 establishments in California
Art Deco architecture in California